The Regional School Unit 1 (RSU 1) in Bath, Maine, includes seven public schools that were part of the Bath School Department:  

 Dike-Newell School (grades K-2), Fisher-Mitchell School (grades 3–5), 
 Phippsburg Elementary (grades Pre-K-5), 
 Woolwich Central School ( Grades Pre-K-8), 
 West Bath School (grades Kindergarten-5), 
 Bath Middle School (grades 6–8), 
 Morse High School (grades 9–12), 
 Bath Regional Career and Technical Center. 

In 2016, the Bath School Department was consolidated with other area schools (West Bath, Phippsburg and Woolwich) to form RSU 1 .

References

External links
 http://www.rsu1.org/

Education in Sagadahoc County, Maine
Bath, Maine
School districts in Maine